Shanghai–Suzhou–Nantong railway, abbreviated as Husutong railway ("Hu", "Su" and "Tong" being the abbreviations for Shanghai, Suzhou and Nantong, respectively) is a higher-speed railway in China's Yangtze River Delta area, connecting Shanghai, the region's main city located south of the Yangtze, with Nantong in Jiangsu province, north of the river.

The railway is also called the Shanghai–Suzhou–Nantong railway or the Husutong railway.

History 
Initially proposed as the Shanghai–Nantong railway (Abbreviated as Hutong railway), construction works began on the first phase of the project in March 2014, and was expected to take five and a half years. The railway began operation on July 1, 2020.

The second phase of the railway, from Taicang to Situan, was approved in September 2021.

Route
The railway includes  of new tracks, from Zhaodian railway station on the Nanjing–Qidong railway northwest of downtown Nantong to Huangdu railway station on the Beijing–Shanghai railway, in the northwestern part of Shanghai City. Anting being within  of Shanghai railway station, the total railway distance from Nantong to Shanghai is under .

The railway crosses the Yangtze River over the new Hutong Yangtze River Bridge between Nantong and Zhangjiagang, a  double-deck bridge with a 4-track railway on the lower deck and a six-lane roadway on the upper deck. The bridge is the world's longest span cable-stayed road-rail bridge with the highest piers of a cable-stayed road-rail bridge. The bridge is the easternmost railway crossing of the Yangtze. The new bridge thus greatly improves the railway connections between the Central Jiangsu (the region north of the Yangtze) and the Jiangnan, in particular Shanghai.

On its way between the new bridge and Anting, the railway has brought rail service for the first time to prosperous communities on the southern bank of the Yangtze such as Zhangjiagang, Changshu, and Taicang which had no railway connection.

Railway Stations

Notes

Railway lines in China
Rail transport in Jiangsu
Rail transport in Shanghai
Railway lines opened in 2020